Urtica gracilis, the California nettle or American stinging nettle, is a herbaceous perennial plant native to most of the United States and Canada. It was considered to be a subspecies of Urtica dioica,  but new analysis has revealed it to be a species, and not closely related to Urtica dioica. Its morphology is similar to Urtica dioica, which led to it being classified as a subspecies of Urtica dioica. The 2 species will not cross pollinate.

References

External links

dioica subsp. gracilis
Flora of North America
Plant subspecies